Hanza (also Romanized as Hanzā and Hanzā’; also known as Hanzar) is a city in Hanza Rural District, Hanza District, Rabor County, Kerman Province, Iran. At the 2006 census, its population was 2,388, in 506 families.

References 

Populated places in Rabor County
Cities in Kerman Province